Woolgarston is a village in Dorset, England.

External links

Villages in Dorset